Liquidambar chingii is a species of plant in the Altingiaceae family. It is native to Vietnam and China. It is threatened by habitat loss.

References

chingii
Flora of China
Flora of Vietnam
Taxonomy articles created by Polbot
Plants described in 2013